The SS Cranston Victory was the 19th of 531 Victory ships built during World War II. Cranston was launched by the Oregon Shipbuilding Corporation on 12 January 1944, completing its journey on 28 February 1944. The ship's United States Maritime Commission designation was VC2-S-AP3, hull number 103 (1019). The Maritime Commission turned it over to a civilian contractor, the South Atlantic Steamship Company, for operation.

The Victory ships were designed to replace the earlier Liberty Ships that were designed to be used exclusively for WW2. Victory ships were designed to last longer and serve the US Navy after the war as these were faster, longer, wider, taller, had a thinner stack set farther toward the superstructure, and had a long raised forecastle.

World War II
The SS Cranston Victory was used as a troopship in World War II in the Pacific and Atlantic Oceans, able to transport up to 1600 troops. In 1945, it traveled from Japan to Seattle. On August 27, 1945, Cranston  Victory arrived in the US from Europe with troops. In October 1945, the SS Cranston  Victory arrived in New York Harbor from Europe with troops. On December 7, 1945, the ship pulled in to Boston with troops from Europe.

SS Cranston Victory and 96 other Victory ships were converted to troop ships to bring the US soldiers home as part of Operation Magic Carpet. These ships had accommodations with fully ventilated and heated rooms. Many had troop warm bunks, a hospital, galleys, washrooms, and public rooms. Cranston Victory'''s duties were short lived as the war came to an end.Troop Ship of World War II, April 1947, Page 356-357

Private use

After the war in 1946 it was laid up in the James River National Defense Reserve Fleet in Virginia. Then on March 14, 1947, Cranston was sold for $1,005,431 to the Netherlands Government operated by Rotterdam Lloyd and named Zuiderkruis (in English the Southern Cross).

Initially, the Netherlands Government used the ship to move troops to the Dutch East Indies (now Indonesia), and then to  Dutch New Guinea. On her return voyages to the Netherlands, Cranston transported Dutch people that wanted to depart the former Dutch East Indies and return to the Netherlands. In 1951 she was rebuilt and converted to a  9,178 g.t. emigrant passenger ship and renamed the Zuiderkruis . Emigrant passengers migrated to the United States, Canada, Australia and New Zealand. When rebuilt a new deck was added and the bridge raised up and placed forward. The accommodations were improved and she could now carry up to 830 passengers.

In 1960 the SS Cranston Victory was rebuilt again to a 9,376 g.t. passenger ship. In 1963 the ship was turned over to the Royal Netherlands Navy as an accommodation and store ship at Den Helder in North Holland, the northernmost point of the North Holland peninsula, the country's main naval base. In 1969 she was scrapped in Bilbao, Spain. The Netherlands Government also purchased the SS Costa Rica Victory, renaming it the SS Groote Beer, and the SS La Grande Victory (nl), renaming it the Waterman, for the same emigrant passengers to use.

See also
List of Victory ships
 Liberty ship
 Type C1 ship
 Type C2 ship
 Type C3 ship

References

Sources
Sawyer, L.A. and W.H. Mitchell. Victory ships and tankers: The history of the ‘Victory type" cargo ships and of the tankers built in the United States of America during World War II'', Cornell Maritime Press, 1974, 0-87033-182-5.
United States Maritime Commission: 
Victory Cargo Ships 

Victory ships
Ships built in Portland, Oregon
United States Merchant Marine
1944 ships
Troop ships of the United States
World War II merchant ships of the United States